Centro Diaz is an International Style building situated in Piazza Diaz in Milan, Italy.

History 
The construction of the building was first foreseen by the 1938 city plan concerning the completion of the southern side of the adjacent Piazza del Duomo. Several projects were suggested, the first of which consisted of a building with a compact shape. A tower was added to the plan by a 1951 project. This was meant to be aligned with the overlooking Galleria Vittorio Emanuele II, situated on the opposite side of the Piazza del Duomo. A private contest was finally organized in 1953, which was won by the Italian architect Luigi Mattioni, who later had to reduce the original height of the tower by  during the final review stages of the project. Construction was ultimated in 1957.

Description 

References

External links

Buildings and structures in Milan
Skyscrapers in Milan